Ivan Yevgenyevich Knyazev (born 5 November 1992) is a Russian football defender.

Career
Knyazev made his debut in the Russian National Football League for Torpedo Moscow on 12 March 2013 in a game against Yenisey Krasnoyarsk. He made his Russian Premier League debut for Torpedo on 16 August 2014 in a game against FC Ural Yekaterinburg.

On 15 March 2021, it was reported that FIFA opened an investigation into Knyazev on suspicion of violating anti-doping rules in 2013. On 18 July 2021, he received a two-year ban from playing from FIFA.

References

External links

1992 births
People from Khanty-Mansi Autonomous Okrug
Living people
Russian footballers
Association football defenders
Russia under-21 international footballers
FC Torpedo Moscow players
Riga FC players
Valmieras FK players
FC Zugdidi players
Russian Premier League players
Latvian Higher League players
Russian expatriate footballers
Expatriate footballers in Latvia
Russian expatriate sportspeople in Latvia
FC Kuban Krasnodar players
FC Irtysh Omsk players
FC Ural Yekaterinburg players
FC Zvezda Perm players
Sportspeople from Khanty-Mansi Autonomous Okrug